Anastasija Sevastova was the defending champion, but lost in the second round to Patricia Maria Țig.

Elena Rybakina won her first WTA Tour title, defeating Țig in the final, 6–2, 6–0.

Seeds

Draw

Finals

Top half

Bottom half

Qualifying

Seeds

Qualifiers

Lucky losers

Draw

First qualifier

Second qualifier

Third qualifier

Fourth qualifier

References

External Links
Main Draw
Qualifying Draw

Bucharest Openandnbsp;- Singles
2019 Singles